Cromwell Historic District  is a national historic district located at Cromwell, Noble County, Indiana.  The district encompasses 33 contributing buildings in the central business district and surrounding residential sections of Cromwell.  It developed between about 1875 and 1953, and includes notable examples of Italianate, Queen Anne, Classical Revival, Tudor Revival, and Bungalow / American Craftsman style architecture. Notable buildings include the Edwin Kline-DeMotte House (c. 1890), Forrest Henney/Henney Funeral Home (1910), Hussey House (1901), Kline Building-Maccabee Hall (c. 1880), Sparta State Bank (c. 1915), Smith's Hall/Knights of Pythias Hall (1910), Pret Lung Meat Market (1917), Calvary Lutheran (Cromwell Evangelical Lutheran) Church (1910), and Biddle's Bakery (1925).

It was listed on the National Register of Historic Places in 2015.

References

Historic districts on the National Register of Historic Places in Indiana
Queen Anne architecture in Indiana
Italianate architecture in Indiana
Tudor Revival architecture in Indiana
Neoclassical architecture in Indiana
Bungalow architecture in Indiana
Historic districts in Noble County, Indiana
National Register of Historic Places in Noble County, Indiana